Gladstone Dock is a dock on the River Mersey, England, and part of the Port of Liverpool. It is situated in the northern dock system in Bootle. The dock is connected to Seaforth Dock to the north and what remains of Hornby Dock to the south. Part of Liverpool Freeport, Gladstone Dock is operated by the Mersey Docks and Harbour Company.

History
The dock is named after Robert Gladstone, a merchant from Liverpool and second cousin of Prime Minister William Ewart Gladstone.

The graving dock was completed in 1913, before the rest of the dock became operational. The graving dock has since been converted into a wet dock (Gladstone Number Three Branch Dock).

Gladstone Dock lock entrance is one of the two remaining operational river entrances in the northern dock system. The Panama Canal and Gladstone locks could accommodate a maximum size of container ship of 4,500-5,000 twenty-foot-equivalent units (TEUs). The lock provided maritime access to the container terminal of the adjacent Royal Seaforth Dock, which opened in 1972.

Rather than enlarge the Gladstone locks to match the size of the Panama locks, the Port of Liverpool built an in-river berth, in the tidal river, serving a new container terminal called Liverpool2. Container ships unable to enter the Gladstone lock will need to use the adjacent in-river berthing at Liverpool2. Liverpool2 solved the problem of the disruption of enlarging the Gladstone locks, and also giving container handling expansion.

Simultaneously the NY-NJ port in the USA deepened its access channel and raised the Bayonne Bridge to accommodate the large vessels transiting the Panama Canal. The expansions at Liverpool and New York means larger ships can operate between the two ports.

At the outbreak of the First World War, the liner RMS Aquitania was undergoing repairs in Gladstone Graving Dock. As a result, she was converted in situ for war service.
During the Second World War, ASW ships, Atlantic convoy escorts and minesweepers were based in the dock.
In 1942 the National Fire Service opened a fire station on Fort Road having a berth for some of its fireboats adjoining the NW Wall of the Dock, this remained open until 1946.

On 25 January 1953, the liner RMS Empress of Canada caught fire and capsized in Gladstone Number One Branch Dock. She was refloated the following year and towed to Gladstone Graving Dock to be made watertight, in preparation for being scrapped in Italy. Transatlantic passenger services continued to use the dock until all such services from Liverpool were discontinued in 1971.

The main line Gladstone Dock railway station closed to passengers on 7 July 1924 while the Liverpool Overhead Railway station Gladstone Dock (LOR) closed in 1956.

A new biomass terminal was built at the docks opening in 2015 with a second phase completed in 2016. Up to 10 trains per day will transport the biomass to power stations.

Current use
As part of Liverpool Freeport, Gladstone Dock's principal uses are: importing coal for the adjacent Hornby Dock coal processing facility, importing biomass from North America at the biomass terminal and exporting scrap metal to the Far East. Gladstone Dock is also used by P&O Ferries for their regular passenger and freight services from Liverpool to Dublin.

Gallery

References

Further reading

External links

 Port of Liverpool 
 

Liverpool docks